The women's individual pursuit competition at the 2018 UEC European Track Championships was held on 4 August 2018.

Results

Qualifying
The first two racers race for gold, the third and fourth fastest rider race for the bronze medal.

 QG = qualified for gold medal final
 QB = qualified for bronze medal final

Finals

References

Women's individual pursuit
European Track Championships – Women's individual pursuit